The Calumet Harbor lighthouse is a three-story, open-air lighthouse and observation tower located in Calumet Harbor, in the town of Calumet, Wisconsin, approximately one mile west of Pipe, Wisconsin. It is located on the eastern shore of Lake Winnebago, inside the Columbia Park, a Fond du Lac County park. The structure is a steel skeletal tower with two flashing white strobe lights located on top.

Notes

Further reading

Havighurst, Walter (1943) The Long Ships Passing: The Story of the Great Lakes, Macmillan Publishers.
Oleszewski, Wes, Great Lakes Lighthouses, American and Canadian: A Comprehensive Directory/Guide to Great Lakes Lighthouses, (Gwinn, Michigan: Avery Color Studios, Inc., 1998) .

Wright, Larry and Wright, Patricia, Great Lakes Lighthouses Encyclopedia Hardback (Erin: Boston Mills Press, 2006) .

External links

Lighthouses in Wisconsin
Buildings and structures in Fond du Lac County, Wisconsin